Joanna Krupa is a Polish-born American model and actress. She is known internationally as the host and head judge of Polish Top Model as well as for appearances on reality television shows Dancing with the Stars and The Real Housewives of Miami.

Early life 
Krupa was born in Warsaw. She was raised Roman Catholic. She has a younger sister, Marta, who is also a model. Krupa moved to Illinois with her family at the age of five. In Chicago, she attended Mary Lyon Public School, Glenbard East High School, followed by Steinmetz High School. Later, the family settled in Los Angeles.

As a child, she trained in classical dance, and later became interested in modeling. As a 13-year-old, she was enrolled by her mother in a modeling school.

Career in modeling 
Under the pseudonym Regina Bartkowski, she appeared briefly in a 2002 pornographic movie Girls Gone Wild featuring Snoop Dogg. She later underwent breast augmentation surgery and began working as a photomodel. She appeared on the covers of many magazines around the world and participated in photo shoots, published in magazines: Glamour (in October 2010, September 2015), Playboy (in the American edition in July 2005, and in the Polish edition in August 2005), CKM (May 2001, June 2006, August 2007, October 2008, December 2011), FHM (in the French edition in May 2013), Most Fitness Magazine, GQ, Personal, Inside Sport, Stuff, Steppin Out, Cosmopolitan, InStyle, Maxim (in the Belgian edition in 2004, in the German edition in 2008 and in the American edition in 2009), Grazia or Viva!. She was one of two Polish women (alongside Sandra Kubicka) whose nudes were published by Treats! magazine. (2017). Being pregnant, she ended up on the cover of Wprost (August 26, 2019) and Viva! (September 5, 2019).

In 2005-2007, she was ranked 78th, 61st and 66th, respectively, in the list of the 100 hottest women of Maxim magazine. In 2007, she was among the 25 sexiest women in the world according to Playboy magazine. In July 2008, on the occasion of the 10th anniversary of CKM magazine, she took third place in the list of the ten sexiest Polish women, created by readers. The German magazine Maxim chose her as "woman of the year 2004." With her sister Marta, she was "Miss Howard TV" December 2007 on Howard TV and The Howard Stern Show.

Career in media 
Since 2010, Krupa hosts and serves as the head judge on the Polish version of Top Model. She was the host of the TVN show Misja pies (2017) and one episode of the Showmax talk show SNL Poland (2018).

She was a contestant on the ninth edition of ABC's entertainment program Dancing with the Stars (2009) and one episode of TVN's reality show Starsza pani musi fiknąć (2019), in which she starred with her mother, as well as a character on the reality show The Real Housewives of Miami (2012-2013). She has been a frequent guest on the breakfast show Dzień dobry TVN. She was a guest on the talk-shows Kuba Wojewódzki (2011), Świat się kręci (2014) and Gwiazdy Cejrowskiego (2017), as well as the protagonist of a series of reports aired on the show Uwaga! (2011-2012).

Animal rights activism 
On December 2, 2009, animal rights organization People for the Ethical Treatment of Animals (PETA) released a print ad campaign for dog adoption featuring Krupa as an angel floating in a Catholic church filled with dogs and holding a crucifix covering her breasts and genitalia. Krupa had previously appeared in a PETA ad campaign against the use of natural fur. In an April 2009 cover story with Aventura Business Monthly, Krupa said she was first motivated to promote PETA when she saw video of animals being skinned alive for their fur in China. She posed covered in body paint for PETA in 2015, this time for its campaign to boycott SeaWorld. She also founded an animal rescue group, Angels For Animal Rescue, with her friend Gabi Gutierrez.

Personal life 
After several years of dating, Krupa became engaged to nightclub owner and businessman Romain Zago in 2010. They married on June 13, 2013, in Aviara, Carlsbad, California. On July 10, 2017, she filed for divorce. The divorce was finalized several weeks later on August 17. On March 25, 2018, she announced her engagement to Douglas Nunes on Instagram. They married on August 4, 2018, in a private ceremony at the Benedictine Abbey in Kraków, Poland. They welcomed daughter Asha-Leigh Nunes on November 2, 2019.

Dancing with the Stars results 

Due to Len Goodman's absence in week 2, the 7 was awarded by stand-in guest judge Baz Luhrmann.
Due to illness Derek Hough was unable to perform; Joanna Krupa performed this dance with Maksim Chmerkovskiy.

Filmography 
 The Underground Comedy Movie (1999) (2010 re-issue)
 Planet of the Apes (2001), Friend at Leo's Party
 Max Havoc: Curse of the Dragon (2004), as Jane
 The Dog Problem (2006), Taffy
 Scary Movie 4 (2006)
 Ripple Effect (2007), Victoria
 Skinner Box (2007), Samantha

Television 
 The Man Show (2002–2003), Juggy Dancer
 Las Vegas episode Degas Away with It (2004), Nicole
 CSI: Crime Scene Investigation episode "Kiss-Kiss, Bye-Bye" (2006), Waitress
 Superstars (2009), Herself
 Dancing with the Stars (2009), Herself
 Million Dollar Challenge (2009), Herself
 Szymon Majewski Show (Polish TV talk show) (2010), Herself, Guest Star
 Poland's Next Top Model (2010–present), Host & Judge
 The Real Housewives of Miami (2012–2013), Herself
 Ridiculousness (2014), Guest Star, Herself

References

External links 

 
 

Living people
Female models from Illinois
American film actresses
American Roman Catholics
American television actresses
Glamour models
Actresses from Chicago
Polish emigrants to the United States
The Real Housewives cast members
21st-century American women
Polish Roman Catholics
Year of birth missing (living people)